Systomus is a genus of fish in the family Cyprinidae native to tropical Asia.

Species
There are currently 18 recognized species in this genus:
 Systomus asoka (Kottelat & Pethiyagoda, 1989) (Asoka barb)
 Systomus chryseus Plamoottil, 2014  (Golden systomus)
 Systomus clavatus (McClelland, 1845) (Stedman barb)
 Systomus compressiformis (Cockerell, 1913)
 Systomus endecanalis (T. R. Roberts, 1989)
 Systomus immaculatus McClelland, 1839
 Systomus jacobusboehlkei Fowler, 1958
 Systomus jayarami (Vishwanath & Tombi Singh, 1986)
 Systomus laticeps Plamoottil, 2016 
 Systomus martenstyni (Kottelat & Pethiyagoda, 1991) (Martenstyn's barb)
 Systomus pleurotaenia (Bleeker, 1863) (Side-striped barb)
 Systomus rubripinnis (Valenciennes, 1842) (Javaen barb)
 Systomus rufus Plamoottil, 2014  (Red-finned kuruva)
 Systomus sarana (F. Hamilton, 1822) (Olive barb)
 Systomus sewelli (Prashad & Mukerji, 1929)
 Systomus spilurus (Günther, 1868)
 Systomus subnasutus  (Valenciennes, 1842) 
 Systomus timbiri (Deraniyagala, 1963)
 Systomus gracilus  Plamoottil & Maji, 2020 (skinny systomus)

References

Plamoottil, M. & Maji, D, (2020) Systomus gracilus: a new fish (Cypriniformes: Cyprinidae) species from West Bengal. Journal of Experimental Zoology, India. 23 (2): 1033- 1038.

 
Cyprinidae genera
Cyprinid fish of Asia